Papam Pasivadu is a 1972 Indian Telugu-language adventure drama film directed by V. Ramachandra Rao and written by Gollapudi Maruti Rao. A remake of the South African film Lost in the Desert (1969), it stars S. V. Ranga Rao, Nagesh, Master Ramu and Devika. The film revolves around a boy who gets lost in a desert, and his attempts to find his family. Papam Pasivadu released on 29 September 1972 and became a commercial success. The film was remade in Tamil as Pillai Selvam.

Plot 

Venugopal and Janaki are a married couple. They soon have a baby boy named Gopi. During Gopi's childhood, he contracts tuberculosis. His family consults their doctor to obtain the best possible treatment for him and they decide to send him to Switzerland with Gopi's uncle Pathy as their pilot. During the journey, Pathy suffers a sudden heart attack, and the plane crashes in Thar Desert. Gopi, with only his dog Tommy accompanying him, has to face several obstacles and finally survives to reunite with his family.

Cast 
S. V. Ranga Rao as Venugopal
 Nagesh as Pathy
Master Ramu as Gopi
M. Prabhakar Reddy as Chakrapani
V. Nagayya as the doctor
Kaikala Satyanarayana as Narasimham
Devika as Janaki
Suryakantham as Durgamma
Chhaya Devi as Subbamma

Production

Development 
After the success of Mosagallaku Mosagadu (1971), which was shot mostly in deserts, its producer Atluri Purnachandra Rao wanted his next venture to also be desert-based. Jamie Uys' South African film Lost in The Desert (1969) had just been released in Andhra Pradesh, and caught Rao's attention; he commissioned Gollapudi Maruti Rao to write a story based on this film, which became Papam Pasivadu. The film was produced by Rao's brother Atluri Seshagiri Rao under their home company Sri Lakshmi Productions, V. Ramachandra Rao was hired as director, M. Kannappa for cinematography, Balu for editing and S. Krishna Rao for direction.

Casting and filming 
When Chukkala Veera Venkata Rambabu or "Ramu" first auditioned for the role of Gopi, he was rejected as the makers felt he was too young for the role. However, he was signed on after several negotiations.  A Pomeranian named Tommy was cast as Ramu's dog of the same name. Principal photography took place in March 1972. The film was shot for 27 days at the Thar Desert, during which Ramu and the dog playing Tommy were the only actors. The scenes involving Gopi's uncle Pathy (Nagesh), Gopi's father Venugopal (S. V. Ranga Rao), Gopi's mother Janaki (Devika), the airport official Chakrapani (M. Prabhakar Reddy) and Venugopal's brother Narasimham (Kaikala Satyanarayana) were shot at studio sets matching the actual location, and on beaches near Madras. Due to difficulty in obtaining further dates for Nagesh, the makers chose K. Chakravarthy to dub his voice. The final length of the film was 139 minutes, longer than Lost in The Desert which was 90 minutes long.

Soundtrack 
The soundtrack was composed by Satyam.

Marketing 
Papam Pasivadu was publicised through publicity pamphlets of the film being thrown from helicopters in various towns, a first for Telugu cinema.

Release and reception 
Papam Pasivadu was released on 29 September 1972 and became a commercial success.

References

External links 
 

1970s Telugu-language films
1972 films
Films directed by V. Ramachandra Rao
Films scored by Satyam (composer)
Films set in deserts
Indian adventure drama films
Indian remakes of foreign films
Telugu films remade in other languages